Canal Place is a  heritage area located in Cumberland, Maryland at the western terminus of the Chesapeake and Ohio Canal.

Overview
The park includes the station plaza, a picnic area, a canal boat replica, a pedestrian bridge to George Washington’s Headquarters (part of Fort Cumberland), picnic area, Shops at Canal Place, the Crescent Lawn Festival Grounds, and the Western Maryland Railway Station, which is on the National Register of Historic Places.

The Cumberland Visitor Center for the C&O Canal National Historical Park is located at Canal Place, and features interactive and educational displays about the history of the canal and the city of Cumberland.  Exhibits tell the story of the canal's construction, cargo, mules, locks, and crew. The exhibit is operated by National Park Service and is located on the first floor of the railway station.

The Western Maryland Scenic Railroad offers rides on historic trains, and departs from the railway station.

"The Cumberland" is a full-size replica of a canal boat located in the Trestle Walk at Canal Place. During special events, costumed guides talk about the history of the canal and daily life aboard a canal boat. Visitors can tour the mule shed, hay house, and furnished Captain's cabin.

The Canal Place facilities are owned and managed by the Canal Place Preservation and Development Authority, an agency created by the State of Maryland in 1993.

Gallery

See also
 Downtown Cumberland Historic District

References

External links
 Canal Place - Official site
 Western Maryland Scenic Railroad
 Cumberland Visitor Center of the Chesapeake & Ohio Canal National Historical Park

Buildings and structures in Cumberland, Maryland
Downtown Cumberland, Maryland
Parks in Cumberland, MD-WV-PA
Parks in Allegany County, Maryland
Museums in Allegany County, Maryland
Transportation museums in Maryland
Canal museums in the United States
National Park Service areas in Maryland
Chesapeake and Ohio Canal